Choornikkara is a census town in Aluva  in Ernakulam District in Kerala, India.

Demographics
 India census, Choornikkara had a population of 36,998. Males constitute 50% of the population and females 50%. Choornikkara has an average literacy rate of 83%, higher than the national average of 59.5%; with male literacy of 85% and female literacy of 80%. 11% of the population is under 6 years of age.

Borders
South - Kalamassery Municipality, Eloor municipality
North -Aluva Municipality, Keezhmadu, Kadungalloore Panchayath in Aluva taluk
East - Edathala, Keezhmadu Panchayath
West - Eloor, Kadungallore Panchayath

Eminent Personalities 
 M.V. Devan
 N. F. Varghese
 Xavier Pulppatt
 J. Pallassery

References

Cities and towns in Ernakulam district
Suburbs of Kochi